The Mürz is a river of Styria, Austria, with a length of .

It passes through Mürzzuschlag. Along its course are the tracks of the Southern Railway as well as the highway . The Mürz discharges into the Mur in Bruck an der Mur.

References

Rivers of Styria
Rax-Schneeberg Group
Mürzsteg Alps
Fischbach Alps
Rivers of Austria